Ochiai Dam  is a rockfill dam located in Hokkaido Prefecture in Japan. The dam is used for irrigation. The catchment area of the dam is 38 km2. The dam impounds about 31  ha of land when full and can store 2400 thousand cubic meters of water. The construction of the dam was started on 1987 and completed in 2001.

References

Dams in Hokkaido